Inquisitor awamoaensis is an extinct species of sea snail, a marine gastropod mollusk in the family Pseudomelatomidae, the turrids and allies.

Description
(Original description)  The shell has an elongato-fusiform shape. The spire produced is larger than the body whorl. The whorls are rounded, spirally striated, and transversely ribbed. Those on the body whorl become obsolete towards the anterior end. The suture is spirally striated. The aperture is narrow. The posterior canal is moderate, the anterior rather produced.

Distribution
This extinct marine species is endemic to New Zealand

References

 Beu, A.G. & Maxwell, P.A. (1990) Cenozoic Mollusca of New Zealand. New Zealand Geological Survey Paleontological Bulletin, 58, 1–518
 Maxwell, P.A. (2009). Cenozoic Mollusca. pp 232–254 in Gordon, D.P. (ed.) New Zealand inventory of biodiversity. Volume one. Kingdom Animalia: Radiata, Lophotrochozoa, Deuterostomia. Canterbury University Press, Christchurch.

awamoaensis
Gastropods of New Zealand